The China Steel Corporation Headquarters is a 29-story,  skyscraper office building in Cianjhen District, Kaohsiung, Taiwan. It houses the corporate headquarters of China Steel Corporation. As of February 2021, it is the 24th tallest building in Kaohsiung.

History
The skyscraper was completed in 2012.

Architecture
It comprises four tubes, bound together by a central core. The facade changes every eight stories, creating outside terrace.

Tenants
 China Steel Corporation
 American Institute in Taiwan Kaohsiung Branch Office

Transportation
The building is accessible within walking distance west of Shihjia Station of Kaohsiung MRT.

See also
 List of tallest buildings in Taiwan
 List of tallest buildings in Kaohsiung

References

2012 establishments in Taiwan
Office buildings completed in 2012
Skyscraper office buildings in Kaohsiung
Postmodern architecture in Taiwan